The RD-0216 and RD-0217 are liquid rocket engines, burning N2O4 and UDMH in the oxidizer rich staged combustion cycle. The only difference between the RD-0216 and the RD-0217 is that the latter has not a heat exchanger to heat the pressuring gasses for the tanks.  Three RD-0216 and one RD-0217 were used on the first stage of the UR-100 ICBM. The engines were manufactured until 1974 and stayed in operational use until 1991. More than 1100 engines were produced.

For the UR-100N project, while first stage propulsion was based on the more powerful RD-0233 engine. The second stage used a variation of the RD-0217 called the RD-0235 (GRAU Index 15D113). It has a fixed nozzle and relies on the RD-0236 vernier engine for thrust vectoring. While the engine has been out of production for a while, the UR-100NU and the Rokot and Strela use it as of 2015.

See also

UR-100
UR-100N
Rokot
Strela
Rocket engine using liquid fuel

References

External links 
 KbKhA official information on the engine.
 KbKhA official information on the engine.

Rocket engines of the Soviet Union
Rocket engines using hypergolic propellant
Rocket engines using the staged combustion cycle
KBKhA rocket engines